Manuk Arsenovich Kakosyan (born 1 August 1974) is a former Armenian professional footballer who also holds Russian citizenship.

Club career
He made his professional debut in the Russian Third League in 1996 for FC Dynamo-Zhemchuzhina-2 Sochi.

References

1974 births
Living people
Sportspeople from Sochi
Armenian footballers
Russian footballers
Association football forwards
Armenia international footballers
Russian Premier League players
FC Zhemchuzhina Sochi players
FC Chernomorets Novorossiysk players
FC Luch Vladivostok players
FC SKA Rostov-on-Don players
Russian sportspeople of Armenian descent
FC Volgar Astrakhan players